The Sextry Barn was a 13th-century tithe barn in Ely, Cambridgeshire, England. It was one of the largest medieval barns in Europe, and was demolished in 1842. It was used to store the corn tithes due to Ely Cathedral, and took its name from the sacrist of the monastery who was in charge of it.

The roof was supported by a double range of oak piers separating it into central and side aisles.

References

Barns in England
Tithe barns in Europe
Ely, Cambridgeshire